Albert W. Overhauser (August 17, 1925 – December 10, 2011) was an American physicist and a member of the National Academy of Sciences. He is best known for his theory of dynamic nuclear polarization known as the Overhauser Effect in nuclear magnetic resonance spectroscopy.

Born in San Diego, California, Overhauser attended high school in San Francisco at Lick-Wilmerding High School  and began his undergraduate work at the University of California, Berkeley in 1942. He interrupted his studies during World War II for a two-year stint in the U.S. Navy Reserve, then returned to Berkeley to complete his education. In 1948 he received undergraduate degrees in physics and mathematics, and in 1951 he received a Ph.D. in physics.

From 1951 to 1953, he was a post-doctoral researcher at the University of Illinois, where he developed his highly cited theory on the transfer of spin polarization; once the theory had been confirmed and demonstrated by other scientists, it became known as the Overhauser Effect. He was on the faculty at Cornell University from 1953 to 1958, and then left to join the research staff at Ford Motor Company. Overhauser remained at Ford until 1973, when he joined the faculty at Purdue University. He remained at Purdue as the Stuart Distinguished Professor of Physics for the rest of his career. Overhauser died in 2011 in West Lafayette, Indiana. He was 86.

Honors and awards
 Received National Medal of Science, 1994
 Elected to the National Academy of Sciences, 1976
 Oliver E. Buckley Solid State Physics Prize, 1975
 Fellow of the American Academy of Arts and Sciences
 Honorary Doctor of Laws degree from Simon Fraser University, 1998
 Honorary Doctor of Science degree from the University of Chicago, 1979
 Honorary Doctor of Science Degree from Purdue University, 2005

References

External links
Biography from the Purdue Department of Physics
 

1925 births
2011 deaths
Members of the United States National Academy of Sciences
American physicists
American nuclear physicists
Purdue University faculty
National Medal of Science laureates
United States Navy reservists
United States Navy personnel of World War II
Fellows of the American Physical Society
Oliver E. Buckley Condensed Matter Prize winners